The Tiwa or Tigua are a group of related Tanoan Puebloans in New Mexico. They traditionally speak a Tiwa language (although some speakers have switched to Spanish and/or English), and are divided into the two Northern Tiwa groups, in Taos and Picuris, and the Southern Tiwa in Isleta and Sandia, around what is now Albuquerque, and in Ysleta del Sur near El Paso, Texas.

Name
Tiwa is the English name for these peoples, which is derived from the Spanish term Tigua and put into use by Frederick Webb Hodge. The Spanish term has also been used in English writings although the term Tiwa now is dominant.

In Spanish Tigua only was applied to the Southern Tiwa groups (in Tiguex territory). Spanish variants of Tigua include Cheguas, Chiguas, Téoas, Tiguas, Tigües, Tiguesh, Tigüex, Tiguex, Tigüez, Tihuex, Tioas, Tziquis. The names Atzigues, Atziqui, Tihues, and Tziquis were originally applied to the Piro but later writers confused these terms for the Piro with the terms for the Southern Tiwa. A further confusion is with some of the terms for the Tewa (Tegua, Tehuas, Teoas) being applied to both the Tewa and (Southern) Tiwa indiscriminately. The term Tiguan is usually given instead Bandelier's Tigüex — this being a representation of the Isletan term for "Southern Tiwas" and recorded in modern times as Tíwan with the term Tiwáde for the singular "(a) Southern Tiwa" (J. P. Harrington recorded the singular as Tiwa and said that Tiwa/Tiwan could also be used to refer to Northern Tiwas).

The Spanish spelling of the name as Tihua is contemporarily accepted, though the anglicized form (Tiwa) is, perhaps, academically more prevalent.

The Governor of the New Mexico Territory, LeBaron Bradford Prince, wrote about a difference between the Tehua pueblos and the Tihua nation.

History

The Tiwa are first mentioned by Coronado in 1540, and a pueblo (town) referred to by him as both Coofor and Tiguex was most likely the pueblo known since a Spanish map of 1602 as Santiago Pueblo (Bandelier's Puaray).  Coronado fought the Tiguex War against 12 of the southern Tiwa pueblos around what is now Albuquerque, which together with the diseases and consolidation of missions by the Catholic priests the Spanish brought, resulted in the abandonment of many of the villages.

In February 1583, the merchant Antonio de Espejo came up the Rio Grande to Tiguex (Kuaua), and Puaray (Espejo's own statement).

The everyday life of Tiwas Indians of Isleta Pueblo during the end of the 19th century is described in the book "The Padre of Isleta". A band of peaceful Tiwa, called Tigua, are massacred in Cormac McCarthy's Blood Meridian, referring to a period around 1849-50.

See also
 Tiwa languages
 Piro Pueblo, a related Pueblo group

References

 Cannon, Cornelia James (1931) Lazaro in the pueblos: the story of Antonio de Espejo's expedition into New Mexico Houghton Mifflin Co., Boston, OCLC 1965297
 
 Samuel Gance, Anton ou la trajectoire d'un père, another story of Isleta's Padre Anton Docher. L'Harmattan, Paris, 2013, 208 p.

External links
 "Tigua Indian Tribe History" Handbook of American Indians 1906
 
 https://web.archive.org/web/20140122141011/http://news.msn.com/in-depth/disenrollment-leaves-natives-culturally-homeless

 
Puebloan peoples
Southwest tribes
Native American tribes in New Mexico